The fourth and final season of the television series Hannah Montana (marketed as Hannah Montana Forever) began airing on Disney Channel on July 11, 2010. In this season, Mitchel Musso's character Oliver Oken becomes a recurring character, and is no longer in the main cast due to Musso preparing for the Disney XD series Pair of Kings. In the season, the Stewarts and Lilly move to a ranch in Malibu. This is the only season of the show to be broadcast in high-definition. The season ended on January 16, 2011.

The fourth and final season of the series was released on DVD on March 8, 2011.

Production 
Disney Channel renewed the series for a fourth season on June 1, 2009 along with a second season for Sonny with a Chance. Production began on January 18, 2010, and ended on May 14, 2010.

Casting 

In season 4, Mitchel Musso was not a part of the main cast; he appeared instead in a recurring role. On March 3, 2010, some guest stars were identified. They include Ray Liotta, Angus T. Jones, Sheryl Crow, and Christine Taylor. Another role that has been introduced is a girlfriend for Jackson, portrayed by Tammin Sursok.

Recurring and guest cast include: Tammin Sursok as Siena, Cody Linley as Jake, Dolly Parton as Aunt Dolly, Vicki Lawrence as Mamaw Ruthie, Shanica Knowles and Anna Maria Perez de Taglé as Amber and Ashley, and Drew Roy as Jesse.

Cast

Main
 Miley Cyrus as Miley Stewart
 Emily Osment as Lilly Truscott 
 Jason Earles as Jackson Stewart 
 Moises Arias as Rico Suave
 Billy Ray Cyrus as Robby Ray Stewart

Special guest
 Mitchel Musso as Oliver Oken

Music 

"Are You Ready", "Ordinary Girl", "I'm Still Good", "Que Sera", and "Gonna Get This" were used to promote season four of Hannah Montana. The soundtrack was released on October 19, 2010.

Episodes 

 This season was filmed from January 18 to May 14, 2010.
 Mitchel Musso is no longer a main cast member; he makes a guest appearance in two episodes.

International release

References 

General references

External links 

 Hannah Montana broadcast schedule at zap2it.com

 
2010 American television seasons
2011 American television seasons

he:האנה מונטנה#העונה הרביעית